Jovan Byford is a Senior Lecturer in Psychology at the Open University in the United Kingdom.

Career and work
Byford is a native of Serbia. He received an M.Sc. in social and applied psychology from the University of Kent and a Ph.D. in social sciences from Loughborough University. His interests lie in the interdisciplinary study of social and psychological aspects of shared beliefs and social remembering and more generally, the relationship between psychology and history. Byford has been widely published, authoring books, book chapters and journal articles dealing with conspiracy theories, antisemitism and Holocaust remembrance. He is considered an expert in the study of conspiracy theory.

Books
Denial and Repression of Antisemitism: Post-Communist Remembrance of the Serbian Bishop Nikolaj Velimirović (Central European University, 2008). 
Discovering Psychology with Nicola Brace. (The Open University, 2010). 
Conspiracy Theories: A Critical Introduction (Springer, 2011). 
Psychology and History: Interdisciplinary Explorations co-edited with Cristian Tileagă (Cambridge University, 2014). 
Picturing Genocide in the Independent State of Croatia: Atrocity Images and the Contested Memory of the Second World War in the Balkans (Bloomsbury, 2020).

References

Living people
Year of birth missing (living people)
Alumni of the University of Kent
Academics of the Open University
Alumni of Loughborough University
Scholars of antisemitism
Social psychologists
Historians of the Balkans
Serbian people of English descent